This is a list of Australian women composers of classical music, contemporary music and/or film soundtracks.

A
 Tina Arena (born 1967)

B

 Alison Bauld (born 1944)
 Betty Beath (born 1932) 
 Una Mabel Bourne (1882–1974) 
 Anne Boyd (born 1946) 
 May Brahe (née Mary Dickson 1884–1956) 
 Amanda Brown (born 1965)
Vera Buck (1903–1986)

C

 Ann Carr-Boyd (born 1938)
 Charlie Chan (born 1966) 
 Alice Charbonnet-Kellermann (1858–1914)
 Deborah Cheetham (born 1964)

 Zana Clarke (born 1965)
 Judith Clingan (born 1945)
 Kate Crawford (born 1976)
 Leah Curtis

D

 Ruby Claudia Davy (1883–1949)
 Catherine Duc
 Melissa Dunphy (born 1980)

E

 Sandy Evans (born 1960)
 Winsome Evans (born 1941)
 Florence Maude Ewart (1864–1949)

F

 Mary Finsterer (born 1962)
 Samantha Fonti (born 1973)
 Jennifer Fowler (born 1939)

G

 Lisa Gerrard (born 1961)
 Helen Gifford (born 1935)
 Peggy Glanville-Hicks (1912–1990)
 Sally Greenaway (born 1984)
 Maria Grenfell (born 1969)

H

 Fiona Joy Hawkins (born 1964)
 Moya Henderson (born 1941)
 Mirrie Hill (1892–1968)
 Dulcie Holland (1913–2000)
 Miriam Hyde (1913–2005)

I

 Dami Im (born 1988)

K

 Elena Kats-Chernin (born 1957)
 Linda Kouvaras (born 1960)

L

 Lynette Lancini (born 1970)
 Liza Lim (born 1966)

M

 Mona McBurney (1862–1932)
 Kathleen McGuire (born 1965)
 Mary Mageau (1934–2020)
 Varney Monk (1892–1967)
 Kate Moore (born 1979)

P

 Katharine "Kitty" Parker (1886–1971)
Linda Phillips (1899–2002)

R

 Esther Rofe (1904–2000)

S

 Ariel Shearer (c. 1905–unknown)
 Margaret Sutherland (1897–1984)
 May Summerbelle (1867–1947)
 Nardi Simpson (born 1975)

T

 Penelope Thwaites (born 1944)
 Katia Tiutiunnik (born 1967)

W

 Gillian Whitehead (born 1941)
 Barbara Woof (born 1958) 
 Emmeline Mary Dogherty Woolley (1843–1908)
 Sally Whitwell (born 1974)

Y
Yunyu

See also
 List of Australian composers

References

External links
(2001.) "Resonating Voices: Australian Women Composers and Musicians in the Oral History Collection of the National Library of Australia." (Abstract.) (Entire document.) National Library of Australia Staff Papers.

Composers
 
Lists of composers by nationality
Lists of women in music
Composers